() is the name of a metre commonly used in classical Sanskrit poetry. The name in Sanskrit means "slow-stepping" or "slowly advancing". It is said to have been invented by India's most famous poet Kālidāsa, (5th century CE), who used it in his well-known poem  ("the Cloud-Messenger"). The metre characterises the longing of lovers who are separated from each other, expressed in the Sanskrit word   "separation (of lovers), parting".

Metrical pattern

Modern analysis
A line in  has 17 syllables, divided into three sections, each separated by a pause. The first section consists of four long syllables, the second of 5 short syllables and one long, and the third a mixture of long and short alternating, in this pattern:
| – – – – | u u u u u – | – u – – u – x |

As with other Sanskrit metres, the length of the final syllable is indifferent.

Deo (2007) argues that the  metre is basically trochaic (i.e. consisting of a "strong-weak, strong-weak" rhythm). She notes that where the third strong beat should come (after the fourth syllable), some performers traditionally leave a pause equivalent to one short syllable; the third strong beat is then silent, and the fourth strong beat then falls on the fourth short syllable. Deo argues that this rhythm is also (a variation of) trochaic, with a strong beat on the 1st, 4th, and 7th syllables.

Relationship to other metres
| – – – – | – u – – u – x |

It thus consists of the beginning and end of the  without the central section.

The 21-syllable  metre goes as follows:
| – – – – u – – | u u u u u u – | – u – – u – x |

This is the same as the  except for an additional four syllables.

If compared with the traditional śloka metre, the  can be seen to be similar. For example, the first line of the Bhagavad Gita scans as follows:
| – – – – | u – – – || u u – – | u – u – |

whereas the  metre is as follows:

| – – – – | u uu uu – || – u – – | u – – |

The differences are as follows:
The śloka can have many variations but in the  every verse is the same.
The second quarter has resolutions, i.e. u uu uu – instead of u – – –.
The fourth quarter of the line is catalectic, i.e. u – – instead of u – u –.
In a  two lines make a stanza, but in  there are four lines in a stanza.

Traditional scansion
(See Sanskrit prosody.) So, the 11th/12th century metrician Kedārabhaṭṭa in his work  characterised the  metre by the following mnemonic line, which is itself in the  metre:

(– – –) ( – | u u ) ( u u u ) (– | – u) (– – u) (–) (–)

Kālidāsa's 
The first poem to use the  metre appears to have been Kālidāsa's  or  "the Cloud-Messenger". This consists of approximately 120 four-line stanzas, each line identical in metre. The opening stanza of the poem is as follows:

"Separated painfully from his beloved, after being negligent of his duty,
having lost his power by a curse, lasting for a year, of his master, 
a certain yakṣa (nature deity) took up, where the water was made pure by the bathing of Janaka's daughter (Sita)
and shady trees were densely clustered, his residence in Rama's mountain hermitages."

When scanning Sanskrit poetry, the vowels e and o are always long.

Later use
Kālidāsa's poem was admired and imitated by many later poets, giving rise to a genre known as  "message poems" or  "messenger poems", mostly in the same metre, although other metres are sometimes used. The  metre was also used in the play  by Bhavabhūti (8th century), for a scene in which the abandoned lover Mādhava searches for a cloud to take a message to his beloved Mālatī.

References

Bibliography
 Deo, Ashwini S. (2007). "The Metrical Organization of Classical Sanskrit Verse". Journal of Linguistics, Vol. 43, No. 1 (Mar., 2007), pp. 63-114.
Michael Hahn: "A brief introduction into the Indian metrical system for the use of students" (pdf)
 Lienhard, Siegfried (1984). A History of Classical Poetry: Sanskrit, Pali, Prakrit.
 Morgan, Les; Sharma, Ram Karan; Biduck, Anthony (2011). Croaking Frogs: A Guide to Sanskrit Metrics and Figures of Speech.
 Pathak, K. B. (1916) Kālidāsa's Meghadūta Sanskrit and English text with notes.
 Reddy, Srinavas (trans.) (2017). Kalidasa: Meghadutam: The Cloud Messenger. (Penguin).
 Sadhale, D. V. (1895). The Meghaduta of Kalidas. Sanskrit and English text with notes.
 Wikisource Sanskrit text of the Meghadūta

External links
 Recitation of the first two stanzas of Meghaduta by Dr R. Ganesh (starts at minute 0:18).
 Recitation of first stanza of Meghadūta by Sangeeta Gundecha.
 Two recitations of Meghadūta (minutes 7:25 and 32.35).
 Meghadūta: transliterated text
 Meghadūta sung to music composed by Vishwa Mohan Bhatt. (Also here)
 Lecture (in Hindi) on Mandākrāntā metre by Prof. Ravendra Mishra. (The stanza above is recited at minute 3:45.)
 Lecture (in Hindi) on Mandākrāntā metre by Dr Vasudev Prasad.
 Grammatical analysis of the quoted verse of Meghadūta.

Sanskrit words and phrases
Poetic rhythm
Indian poetics